Pezoporikos Club Larnaca (Pezoporikos Omilos Larnakas) was a Cypriot sports club based in Larnaca with football, basketball and volleyball teams. Founded in 1927, the football club joined the Cypriot Championship in 1938, winning it twice as well as one Cypriot Cup. The colours of the club were green and white. In 1994 the club merged with EPA Larnaca and they formed AEK Larnaca.

The club also had a basketball and volleyball department and were basketball champions four times and five times cup winners. Since the 1990–91 season, the club dominated the Cyprus Basketball by winning 3 championships and one cup in four years. During the 1993–94 season the team eliminated Hapoel Eilat with 86–80 and 65–65 for the Korać Cup and qualified in the second round of Korać Cup where they were eliminated by Panionios. Even as champions, the club merged like the football department, however, AEK Larnaca didn't continue with the same success as Pezoporikos Basketball Club had.

Founding member of the Cyprus Volleyball Federation, the volleyball women's team was more successful than the men's one. The women's team won the Cup once in 1979 when they beat AEL Limassol in the final 3–2. They were Runners up twice each in the championship and in the cup.

Former players (football section)

 Jim McSherry (1983–84)
 Ian Alexander (1985–86)
 Spiros Livathinos (1986–88)
 Stavros Papadopoulos (1980–81)
 Neophytos Larkou (1987–94)
 Uwe Bialon (1987–94)

Honours

Football
 Cypriot Championship:
 Champions (2): 1953–54, 1987–88
 Runner-up (8): 1939–40, 1952–53, 1954–55, 1956–57, 1957–58, 1969–70, 1973–74, 1981–82
 Cypriot Cup:
 Winners (1): 1969–70
 Runner-up (7): 1939–40, 1951–52, 1953–54, 1954–55, 1971–72, 1972–73, 1983–84
 Super cup:
 Runner-up (2): 1954, 1988

Basketball
 Cyprus Basketball Division 1: (4) 1973, 1991,1992,1994
 Cypriot Cup (5): 1969, 1970, 1971, 1972, 1992

Former players
 Darrell Armstrong  (1993)
 William Sanchez  (1999)

Volleyball (women)
 Cypriot Championship:
 Runner-up (2): 1977, 1989
 Cypriot Cup:
 Winners (1): 1979
 Runner-up (7): 1989,1990

History in European competition

Overall

Matches

References

Association football clubs established in 1927
Association football clubs disestablished in 1994
AEK Larnaca FC
Basketball teams in Cyprus
Volleyball clubs in Cyprus
Defunct basketball teams
Defunct football clubs in Cyprus
Women's volleyball teams in Cyprus
1927 establishments in Cyprus
1994 disestablishments in Cyprus
Pezoporikos Larnaca
Football clubs in Larnaca